Green Man is a character appearing media published by DC Comics, primarily as a member of the Green Lantern Corps. He first appeared in Green Lantern (vol. 2) #164 (May 1983), and was created by writer Todd Klein and artist Dave Gibbons.

Fictional character biography
Green Man is a lesser known member of the Green Lantern Corps and is the adopted name of the Green Lantern from the 2828 Space Sector. He originates from the planet of Uxor. Green Man is a misfit who rebelled against his planet’s anti-individualism and longed for a personal identity. When the Guardians of the Universe offered him a position as a member of their Green Lantern Corps, Green Man jumped at the chance. As a consequence, Green Man could never again legally enter his home star system. This was due to the pact the Guardians made with the Psions of Vega, which prohibits the Green Lantern Corps presence in that sector. Green Man enlisted the help of the Omega Men to attack the nestworld of a group of humanoid arachnids, known as the Spider Guild, which lived a few light years outside the Vega system. This resulted in a reprimand by the Guardians, which ultimately lead to the Green Man quitting the Green Lantern Corps and joining the Omega Men. 

As a member of the Omega Men, Green Man encounter many other beings in his adventures, such as the goddess X'Hal, who live inside the star Vega; the whale-like Viathans; the Psions, who perform experiments on Green Man when he was brought to their research center, Wombworld; the Tamarans, and others. The Green Man was killed by Durlans in the Invasion! mini-series when the Omega Men were attacked by a coalition of aliens who were eliminating any opposition, including members of the then-disbanded Green Lantern Corps.

Second Green Man

A second Uxorian also known as Green Man is partnered with the robot Stel, the Green Lantern of the planet Grenda, in Sector 3009, as seen in the miniseries Green Lantern Corps: Recharge. Green Man is one of the Lanterns who participated in the defense of Oa against the onslaught of Superboy-Prime, as depicted in Infinite Crisis #7. Showing remorse over the apparent death of his partner, Green Man searched for Stel and found him badly damaged, but functioning. The two then retreated to Mogo to ready themselves physically and mentally for the attacking Sinestro Corps.

Following the Sinestro Corps War, the Guardians of the Universe established a new unit within the ranks of the Green Lantern Corps to uphold the Ten New Laws of the Book of Oa. This unit became known as the Alpha Lantern Corps. Green Man has been confirmed as a member of the Alpha Lanterns. He is later shown in Final Crisis #1. He appears again in issue #5, during Hal Jordan's trial and the subsequent events that clarify fellow Alpha Lantern Kraken is possessed by Granny Goodness.

Death
In the 2010 - 2011 "Brightest Day" storyline, Cyborg Superman hijacks the Alpha Lantern Corps. After he is defeated and the Alphas freed from his control, Ganthet managed to restore their emotions, including Green Man's. During the 2012 "War of the Green Lanterns" storyline, Alpha Lantern Varix comes to feel that all the Alphas have become dangerously mentally unstable, and causes a reaction which kills all the Alpha Lanterns.

Powers and abilities
The Green Man, after being stripped of his ring and lantern by the Guardians, demonstrated an ability to produce a portal which he could hear and see though and use to transport himself. He was also able to pick up on the brainwaves of others in a form of telepathy.

Uxorians possess a deadly nerve toxin in their blood stream, which acts as a defense mechanism against predators. Uxorians are also amphibious. Upon his induction in the Alpha Lantern Corps, he is turned into a cyborg, fully covered with metallic plates. He carries a power battery embedded into his chest, no longer needing to recharge his ring from an external source, and a secondary face under his faceplate able to drain power rings, like the Manhunters have.

Other versions
Green Man also features in the 2000 miniseries Green Lantern Versus Aliens, in which he assists in placing the titular aliens on Mogo.

In other media
Green Man makes a cameo appearance in the animated film Green Lantern: First Flight, as one of several Green Lanterns fighting Sinestro.

Green Man makes a cameo appearance in the live-action film Green Lantern.

Green Man appears in Justice League Dark: Apokolips War. He is among the Green Lanterns who are on Oa when Darkseid attacks and is killed by him.

References

External links
 Green Man at the Book of Oa
 Green Lantern #164 at the Grand Comics Database

Comics characters introduced in 1983
DC Comics aliens
DC Comics extraterrestrial superheroes
DC Comics superheroes
DC Comics cyborgs
Characters created by Mike W. Barr
Characters created by Dave Gibbons
Characters created by Geoff Johns
Green Lantern Corps officers